Kutman Kadyrbekov (born June 13, 1997) is a Kyrgyzstani professional footballer who plays as a goalkeeper for Kyrgyz Premier League club Alga Bishkek and the Kyrgyzstan national team.

Career

Club
He won the Kyrgyzstan League with Dordoi Bishkek in 2018.

International
He was included in Kyrgyzstan's squad for the 2018 Asian Games in Indonesia, and the 2019 AFC Asian Cup in the United Arab Emirates. Kadyrbekov made his debut for Kyrgyzstan national football team in an AFC Asian Cup group match on 11 January 2019 against South Korea.

Career statistics

Club

International

Statistics accurate as of match played 21 January 2019

References

External links

1997 births
Living people
Sportspeople from Bishkek
Kyrgyzstan international footballers
Kyrgyzstani footballers
Association football goalkeepers
FC Dordoi Bishkek players
Footballers at the 2018 Asian Games
2019 AFC Asian Cup players
Asian Games competitors for Kyrgyzstan